The Pro Ötztaler 5500 was a one-day road cycling race held annually in Austria. It was rated as a category 1.1 event on the 2017 UCI Europe Tour.

At the end of 2017, the organizers announced that the race would no longer be held due to a lack of television coverage and a conflict with other events on the UCI calendar.

Winners

References

Cycle races in Austria
UCI Europe Tour races
Recurring sporting events established in 2017
2017 establishments in Austria
Defunct cycling races in Austria